The Government of Rivers State consists of elected representatives and appointed officials responsible for the government of Rivers State, Nigeria. Rivers State has a population of about 5 million people, and is one of the 36 states that make up the Federal Republic of Nigeria. The state government is composed of the executive, legislative, and
judicial branches, whose powers are vested by the
Constitution in the House of Assembly, the Governor and the High Court. The judiciary operates independently of the executive and the legislature. At the local level, elected officials are in charge of local government areas.

Executive
The executive branch is headed by the Governor, assisted by the Deputy Governor, both elected. The governor appoints the heads of parastatals, state-owned bodies, judicial officers, permanent secretaries and members of the Executive Council with the exception of the deputy. The Civil Service is administered by the head of service, a career civil servant, with each ministry managed by a permanent secretary. The commissioner is responsible for policy, while the permanent secretary provides continuity and is responsible for operations.

Governor

As the highest ranking-official in the executive, the Governor of Rivers State wields significant influence in matters relating to the governance of the state. As in most presidential systems, the governor is both the head of government and head of state. The governor is empowered by the Constitution to preside over the Executive Council, as well as to appoint, dismiss or reappoint its members–excluding the deputy governor–at will. In addition the governor may sign legislation passed by the House into law or may veto it, however, the bill automatically becomes law after 30 days if the governor does not sign the legislation.

A vote by a two-thirds majority in the House can overrule the governor. The same vote is required to initiate an impeachment process of the governor or the deputy governor. When the chief executive is unable to discharge their duties, the deputy governor assumes the office of Acting Governor until the governor resumes duty, or until election of a new governor.

Since achieving statehood, Rivers State has had a total of 6 governors. Four of the former governors are still alive while only one has died. The longest serving governor is Peter Odili, a physician by profession. He spent 2,923 days in office.

Deputy Governor

The position of Deputy Governor of Rivers State constitutes the vice-head of state and government, created when the federation returned to civilian authority under the Second Republic. Whoever holds the post is considered the second highest official in the executive branch. The deputy governor is also seen as the first official in line to succeed the Governor of Rivers State, should that office be vacated.

The deputy governor is elected concurrently on a ticket with the
governor for a term of four years renewable once. The annual salary for the office as of 2009 is ₦2,112,215. Physician Ipalibo Banigo is the first woman to hold the position since it was established. Banigo, formerly a civil servant in the Ministry of Health, was chosen by governor Ezenwo Nyesom Wike to be his running mate in the 2015 election.

Executive council

The executive council is currently made up of:

Ministries

Agencies and Parastatals

Agencies and parastatals, typically reporting to a ministry, include:
Road Maintenance and Rehabilitation Agency
Road Traffic Management Authority
Rivers State University of Science and Technology
Rivers State Television Authority
Rivers State Sustainable Development Agency
Rivers State Polytechnic
Rivers State Newspaper Corporation
Rivers State Microfinance Agency
Housing and Property Development Authority
Rivers State College of Health Science and Technology
Rivers State College of Arts and Science
Rivers State University of Education
Rivers State Broadcasting Corporation
Rivers State Agricultural Development Programme
Universal Basic Education Board
Senior Secondary Schools Board
Christian Pilgrims Welfare Board
Muslim Pilgrims Welfare Board
Local Government Service Commission
Rivers State Waste Management Authority

Legislature

The Rivers State House of Assembly is the unicameral legislative body of the state government. It was established in 1979 by part II, section 84 of the Constitution of Nigeria, which states "There shall be a House of Assembly for each of the States of the Federation". Led by a Speaker, the House of Assembly consists of 32 members, each elected to four-year terms in single-member
constituencies by plurality. Its
primary responsibility is to create laws for the peace, order and effective government of the state.

Powers
There are numerous powers the Constitution expressly and specifically granted to the House of Assembly as they are necessary for its relevance. These include the powers to approve budget estimates presented to it by the executive; to make laws establishing the chargeable rates and the procedure to be used in assessing and collecting the rates charged by each local government council; confirm gubernatorial appointments, oversee and monitor activities of government agencies, review policy implementation strategies of the executive, summon before it and question a commissioner about the conduct of his or her ministry especially when the affairs of that ministry are under consideration and to initiate impeachment proceeding in order to secure the removal of the governor or the deputy.

Current Representatives
The legislature consists of elected representatives from each constituency. As of June 12, 2015 they were:

Judiciary

The administration of justice in Rivers State is one of the fundamental duties of the judiciary of the state. This branch of government explains and applies the laws by hearing and eventually making decisions on various legal cases. It has a regulatory or supervisory body known as the Judicial Service Commission, which takes care of appointment, promotion and disciplinary issues of the judiciary.

The Chief Judge of Rivers State is the appointed head of the judicial branch. The chief judge is also the most senior judge and presiding member of the High Court of Justice. Among other responsibilities, the chief judge has the ceremonial duty of administering the oath of office of the Governor of Rivers State. In modern tradition, the chief judge retires voluntarily at sixty years of age, or statutorily at sixty five.

Most appointments to the judiciary are made by the governor, but acting upon the recommendation of the National Judicial Council. At present, there are about 10 judicial divisions within the High Court of Justice, and about 26 judges carrying out their professional work.

Elections and voting

Local government
Local government areas handle local administration, under an elected chairman.

Rivers State is divided into twenty-three local government areas (LGAs):

See also
Judiciary of Rivers State
Elections in Rivers State
Nigerian National Assembly delegation from Rivers

References

 
Rivers State